Pankaj Singh (born 12 December 1978) is an Indian politician who is Bharatiya Janta Party (BJP)'s General Secretary for Uttar Pradesh. Pankaj has been active in politics since 2002 and is the present MLA of Noida. On 11 March 2017, he won the Noida Vidhan Sabha seat in the UP Legislative Assembly election. He is the Vice-President of BJP in Uttar Pradesh state. He is the elder son of Rajnath Singh, the present Defence Minister of India.

Early life and education
Thakur Pankaj Singh did MBA (PGDM) in 2001 from Amity Noida, B.Com from Dyal Singh College in 1999 after completing his senior secondary from Mahanagar Boys' Inter College Lucknow in 1996.

Personal life

Pankaj Singh married Indian shooter, Sushma Singh, in November, 2004. Sushma is daughter of Narayan Singh Rana, and sister of Jaspal Rana. 

Pankaj and Sushma have 2 children, daughter Diya and son Arya Veer.

References

External links
 

Bharatiya Janata Party politicians from Uttar Pradesh
Uttar Pradesh MLAs 2017–2022
Uttar Pradesh MLAs 2022–2027
People from Noida
1978 births
Living people